Nature Reviews Immunology is a monthly review journal covering the field of immunology. The journal also publishes "Research highlight" articles, which are short summaries written by the editors that describe recent hot research papers. The editor-in-chief is Alexandra Flemming.

According to the Journal Citation Reports, the journal has a 2021 impact factor of 108.555, ranking it 1st out of 161 journals in the category "Immunology".

References

External links
 Official website

Nature Research academic journals
Publications established in 2001
Monthly journals
English-language journals
Immunology journals
Review journals